Josh Elder (born May 17, 1980 in Carmi, Illinois) is an American journalist, lecturer and writer, primarily of comic books and graphic novels.

Early life
Josh Elder graduated from Northwestern University with a bachelor's degree in Film.

Career
Josh Elder (sometimes credited as Joshua Elder) is a comic book author and the creator (along with artist Erich Owen) of the graphic novel series and nationally syndicated comic strip Mail Order Ninja. A former associate editor at "Wizard Magazine", Elder also serves as noted graphic novel reviewer for the Chicago Sun-Times and Director of Operations for the literacy advocacy group Reading with Pictures. He regularly gives workshops on creating comics and graphic novels at schools, libraries and universities across the country. He has also participated in and led professional development seminars for teachers and librarians—including the New York Public School system and the Children's Museum of Indianapolis.

Elder currently resides in Albany Park, Chicago.

Awards
Elder was named one of the 25 great graphic novels for kids by the School Library Journal.

Published works 
This table lists only works in which Elder is  the primary writer (or co-writer) of a published book with an ISBN.

References

External links 
 Q&A at Living Between Wednesdays
 Presenting at Cusp Conference 2010 (video)

1980 births
Living people
American comics writers
People from Carmi, Illinois